Markus Hinterhäuser (born 30 March 1958 (1959 according to other sources) in La Spezia, Italy) is an Austrian pianist and the current Artistic Director of the Salzburg Festival. He studied music at the Vienna Conservatory under Elisabeth Leonskaja and the Mozarteum University of Salzburg under Oleg Maisenberg. As a chamber musician, he has performed with several notable performers, including the Arditti Quartet and singer Brigitte Fassbaender. As a piano soloist he is particularly known for his performances of the works of the Second Viennese School and 20th century works by composers like John Cage, Luigi Nono, Morton Feldman and Galina Ustvolskaya. Since 2006 he has served as the Concert Director of the Salzburg Festival, a post he is scheduled to leave after the 2011 summer festival.

Sources
Salzburg Festival, Biography: Markus Hinterhäuser

1958 births
Living people
Austrian pianists
University of Music and Performing Arts Vienna alumni
Mozarteum University Salzburg alumni
21st-century pianists